Daniel Lindström (born 30 January 1978) is a Swedish singer from Umeå who won the Swedish Idol 2004 contest against Darin Zanyar. His first single, "Coming True", sold double platinum, and his self-titled album, released in December 2004, topped the Swedish pop charts. The second album Nån slags verklighet (Some kind of reality) contains songs written in Swedish by the singer himself. His third album, D-Day, was released in January 2009. For a time, he lived with his wife and child in Solna, Sweden.

In October 2009, Lindström and other Idol contestants convened for a panel at CMJ in New York City, to discuss their experiences and the current state of music.

Idol 2004 performances
Semi-finals: Lately by Stevie Wonder
Top 11: Fast love by George Michael
Top 10: Crazy by Seal
Top 9: If You Don't Know Me By Now by Harold Melvin & the Blue Notes
Top 8: Sarah by Mauro Scocco
Top 7: That's The Way It Is by Celine Dion
Top 6: Fly Me to the Moon by Frank Sinatra
Top 5: License To Kill by Gladys Knight
Top 4: September by Earth, Wind & Fire
Top 4: Just The Way You Are by Billy Joel
Top 3: Lately by Stevie Wonder
Top 3: Glorious by Andreas Johnson
Grand Final: Coming True written by Jörgen Elofsson (Winning Song)
Grand Final: Virtual Insanity by Jamiroquai
Grand Final: Sarah by Mauro Scocco

Discography

The following is a complete discography of every album and single released by Swedish Pop music artist Daniel Lindström.

Studio albums

Singles

Songwriting in Asia 
Lindstrom is a co-writer of “Let It Go” by Jacky Cheung on Cheung’s “Private Corner” album. His single release “Caught In That Feeling” was covered by Jason Dy, winner of The Voice of The Philippines, on Dy’s self-titled album “Jason Dy”.

References

External links
 
 Daniel Lindstrom. discogs.com

1978 births
Living people
Idol (Swedish TV series) winners
21st-century Swedish singers
21st-century Swedish male singers